Antelope was a French vessel launched in 1795 and captured circa 1798. She sailed primarily as a West Indiaman until circa 1804 when Daniel Bennett purchased her and sent her out as a privateer operating off South America, first in the Atlantic and then the Pacific. A Spanish armed merchantman captured her in 1805, in a single ship action that resulted in the death of Antelopes master. A Spanish merchant then sent Antelope to Spain.

West Indiaman
Antelope first appeared in Lloyd's Register (LR) in 1799. The surveyors designated her "AN" – almost new,i.e., less than three years old.

Captain Robert Younghusband acquired a letter of marque on 6 June 1799, and sailed from Deal for Demerara on 18 June. From Demerara she sailed to Surinam.

Captain John Pashley acquired a letter of marque on 26 July 1805.

Privateer
Samuel Bennett purchased Antelope in 1804, and her first master for him appears to have been John Samuel Parker. She only appeared under Bennett's ownership in the Register of Shipping for 1806 (and never in LR), it gives her trade as London–Southern Fishery.

On 10 January 1805 Captain James Mortlock acquired a letter of marque. Although Bennett owned whaling ships and Antelope sailed for the South Seas, she was a privateer, not a whaler.

An Antelope and Lucy, both listed as privateers, were at Portsmouth on 25 January. Antelope may have returned to London because she was listed as being at Deal on 28 February, waiting to sail to the South Seas.

Both were privateers. Alexander Ferguson had received a letter of marque on 10 January 1805. Dean had received one 14 December 1804. Antelope had sprung her foremast and was going to put into St Catherine's to repair. The information for the news came via Bellona, which had returned to Liverpool.

In April 1806 Lloyd's List reported that Antelope, Mortlock, master, and Kitty, Musgrave, master, were well in October 1805 off the coast of South America. Thomas Musgrave had received a letter of marque on 5 February 1805.

Antelope had left England in company with another privateer, possibly Lucy. In her cruise near Montevideo Antelope took five prizes and forced the Spanish warship Asuncion aground in bad weather. He dispatched his companion privateer back to England with the prizes, and decided to round Cape Horn to look for prizes off Callao.

Near Valparaiso Antelope captured two launches that she relieved of their stores. At Coquimbo Mortlock looted a church and some farms. In sight of the island of San Gallao he seized two guano brigs, took their spars for firewood, removed their compasses, and prevented them from entering Callao and alerting the authorities to his presence. (Apparently Mortlock did dissuade his crew from scuttling the two brigs with all hands.)

Fate
On 13 October Antelope was some eight leagues from the island of San Lorenzo when she encountered Nuestra Senora de Isiar (alias Joaquina), Don Domingo de Ugalde, master. She had a crew of 70, fourteen 8-pounder cannon and two ‘howitzers’ (possibly obusier de vaisseau. Her cargo consisted of 150 black slaves shackled below deck, and cargo worth a million pesos belonging to the King of Spain and private individuals. She had left Callao on 24 December 1804 the outbreak of war between Spain and England had led de Ugalde to decide to return to Callao.

Around 7pm an engagement developed with an exchange of gunfire at short range. Antelope repelled Joaquinas first attempt to board but succumbed to the second. In the fight Antelope suffered 15 men killed, Mortlake among them, and 16 wounded, most mortally. Joaquina had four dead and 14 wounded, of whom four were mortally wounded. A later account gives the casualties as Mortlake and four of his men killed, 15 wounded. Joaquins casualties were four men killed and 14 men wounded. The same account gives Antelopes armament as ten 12-pounder carronades, five 6-pounder guns, and one 3-pounder bronze gun.

The prize court valued Antelope at 100,000 pesos. She was apparently brought back into mercantile service on the Pacific Coast.

On October 1805, Viceroy Avilés ordered Antelope be transferred to the shipowner Javier María de Aguirre. Aguirre dispatched Antelope to Santander on 24 December. claimed and obtained the Antílope for himself,
dispatching it on December 24 of that year to Santander.

Lloyd's List reported on 15 July 1806 that an armed Spanish ship had captured Antelope, of London, Mortlock, master, off the coast of Peru. It also reported that Mortlock had been killed.

Notes

Citations

References
 
 
 

1795 ships
Ships built in France
Captured ships
Age of Sail merchant ships of England
Privateer ships of the United Kingdom